Florence Knapp is the name of:

 Florence Knapp (supercentenarian), US supercentenarian
 Florence E. S. Knapp (c. 1875–1949), US politician and New York Secretary of State